Li Xian (born 19 October 1991) is a Chinese actor. He began his acting career by playing minor role in the film Feng Shui (2012). His first major role came as a red fox in the adventure fantasy film Soul Snatcher (2020). Xian had his small-screen debut in the web series City of Fantasy (2014). His breakthrough role came in the esports drama, Go Go Squid! (2019). Xian appeared in Forbes Asia 100 Digital Stars list and Forbes China Celebrity 100 list in 2020.

Early life 
Li Xian was born on October 19, 1991, in Xianning and grew up in Jingzhou, Hubei. Xian was educated at the Jingzhou Middle School in Jingzhou. In 2009, he planned to study STEM in college, but he failed the annual college entrance examination. So he retook the test and was enrolled in acting major at Beijing Film Academy in 2010. For the convenience of entry, Xian changed his Chinese name from "晛" to "现", which means "present".

Career

2011–2018: Career beginnings and breakthrough 
Xian began his acting career with a minor role in the director Wang Jing's film Feng Shui (2012) as a young Li Xaoli. He followed it with a role in the romantic teen film Singing When We're Young (2012). He made his small-screen debut in the first China's urban web series City of Fantasy (2014), in which he played a depressed young widower who rely on drugs to continue to live after his wife passed away named A Liang. Xian then appeared in the coming-of-age brotherhood web series, Who Sleeps My Bro (2016) as a troubled university student named Xie Xun. These part led him to being cast in the feature film adapted from the web series. He followed it with an appearance in the music video for the song I Am Jiang Xiaobai by Zhang Qi and the music video for the song Medals by Lu Han. Later, Xian was cast in the esports romance film Love O2O (2016), playing an online game developer team named Yu Banshan. In the same year, he was cast in hisfirst Chinese forensic web series Medical Examiner Dr. Qin as one of the investigative team criminal police captain, Lin Tao.

Xian received his first starring role in the thriller detective web series Tientsin Mystic as the god river who solves complicated case by his logical reasoning and judgement, Guo Deyou. To better depict the character, he learned the Mengzi dialect, freediving, snorkeling, and deep diving. He won a The Actors of China Awards for Outstanding Actor for the first time for the role in 2017. Xian then appeared in the film The Founding of an Army (2017),  Luo Ronghuan . In 2018, Xian starred in the romance television series Only Side by Side with You as a special forces agent, Chang Jianxiong. He gained 20 pounds in 45 days for the role. Xian then made a special appearance in the web series urban drama Women in Shanghai as a fresh graduate who looking for a job in Shanghai named Chen Xiaowei.  Also that year he was starring in film Nuts as intelligence university student, Xu Zicong.

Xian's breakthrough role came in the esports romantic comedy television series, Go Go Squid! (2019) based on the Mo Bao Fei Bao's novel Stewed Squid with Honey. He portrayed Han Shangyan, a passionate young man, who had dedicated his life to winning a world championship for China. The series was the most-streamed series in 2019. Xian was awarded The Actors of China Award for outstanding actor in 2019 and 2020 as well as his first nomination for the Huading Award for Best New Actor in 2019 for the role. Xian contributed to the soundtrack song For Future (Gei Wei Lai), which appeared on Billboard China Social Chart as well as Billboard China Top 100 for 10 weeks and peaked at Top 7. Xian then made a special appearance as an air traffic controller in the Chinese film The Captain, which was directed by Hong Kong's Andrew Lau Wai-keung and is based on a real-life mid-air crisis aboard a Sichuan Airlines flight. Xian was awarded Best Choice of Multi-Screen Communication for Influential Actor in 2020 for the role. Also that year he was starring in n the live action costume drama Sword Dynasty. He started sword training and physical training three months prior to the start of filming. Xian received a nomination at the Busan International Film Festival Asia Contents Award for best actor for the role.

2020–present: Film series and awards success 

In 2020 Xian participated for the first time in the CCTV New Year's Gala where he performed "Hello 2020". In the same year he has two starring films postponed due to the COVID-19 pandemic; The Enigma of Arrival and  Soul Snatcher.  He played Xiao Long in The Enigma of Arrival. Later, he made a special appearance as IT staff in the Chinese entry for the Best International Feature Film at the 93rd Academy Awards, Leap. Later he starring in Mei Feng first directed romance film Love Song 1980. The film was adapted from Yu Xiaodan's novel "The Lover in 1980". It follows this character which is set in the 1980s, facing the fate of the times and social waves, using love as a guide, seeking spiritual truth. Marko Stojiljković of Asian Movie Pulse wrote: "here is more than just a dash of everyman in Li Xian’s interpretation of Zheng Wen that could have been seen in some of the finest European actors of the past (for instance, Marcello Mastroianni),..." His final film of the year was in Song Haolin's f adventure fantasy film Soul Snatcher  Xian sang the soundtrack title  Glorious Future (Qian Cheng Si jin) with Chen Linong, which peaked at No. 8 on Billboard China Social Chart.

Upcoming projects 
Xian will next star in Wang Wei's historical television series A Love Never Lost and portrait a patriotic young man during a republican era. The series will be broadcast by Beijing TV and distributed worldwide by iQIYI in 2021. He also slated to star in Guo Zijian and Han Sanping's adventure suspense film adaptation of Ma Bo Young's Antique Bureau Central Bureau novel Schemes in Antiques

Public image

General
 
Li has been labeled as the "Present boyfriend". The first impression of Li is modesty. Chi Xiangzhen, head of Weiquan, praised Li's sunny and fresh image, his work ethic, and his modern attitude. Actress Yang Zi, Li's co-star in Go Go Squid!, complimented him for being one of the most serious and dedicated actors she has worked with. She argued against the belief that Li became an overnight sensation by citing his previous hard work in the industry. In 2019, GQ's editor mentioned Li as the best example of a hard-working individual bound for success. CEO Yang Tian Zen told Youth With You's contestants to follow Li's example of navigating fame. She praised Li for learning Japanese and English to improve his acting skills instead of solely seeking wealth. Actress Liu Tianchi also praised Li's professionalism. 
 
Li has listed He Zhengyu, Oguri Shun, Ryan Gosling as his favorite actors. He wants to create characters and storylines that have a positive effect on the film industry, audience, and society. He has always loved watching movies and sharing film reviews. He even predicted the Oscar winner list for 2020 with 90% accuracy.

Li doesn't consider himself to be an idol; he always refers to himself as an actor. He is recognized for his masculine appearance, style, positive energy and good attitude. He has been featured often in fashion magazines, experimenting with different modeling styles He posed for both classic and artistic portrait styles in GQ magazine's May 2020 issue. His modern photos appeared in L'OFFICIELX magazine's August 2019 issue. In the same year, Li was invited by Elle to appear with Yangzi, his costar in Go Go Squid! on their magazine cover. The issue sold more than 20,000 copies in the first two printings. Li showed off his suit style in LEON the Professional with Chunxia in January 2020. He is the first Chinese artiste to grace the cover of 'Dazed Korea' magazine

Weibo
Li Xian likes to talk about sports, book lists, music, and movies on his Weibo. In 2019, during the broadcast of his drama Go Go Squid!, Xian's Baidu Index, WeChat Index, and Weibo all ranked first in follower growth. His followers on Weibo grew quickly from 5 million to 20 million. Xian is one of Baidu’s Top 10 most-searched celebrities of 2019.

Philanthropy
In 2016, Li was an ambassador at the Xindi Charity Vertical Run-Bravely Go to Shanghai IFC of the Vertical Marathon World Tour, held at the Shanghai International Financial Center. He participated in the opening ceremony and aerobics classes with children at the event. In March 2017, he participated in the promotion of the United Nations's World Wildlife Day with public welfare videos and social media posts, calling on the public to actively participate in the protection of wildlife and defend the natural environment. Li advocated against pollution using public welfare videos for the third United Nations Environment Conference in December 2017, which focused on promoting "a zero-pollution earth." In 2018, Li was appointed as a brand ambassador of White Magnolia's Reading Program at the 24th Shanghai TV Festival.

Li is the goodwill ambassador of the China Youth Development Foundation. On January 29, 2020, he donated 200,000 yuan to the foundation's "Fight against the Epidemic – Project Hope Special Action" to support efforts against the COVID-19 pandemic. His act lead fans to spontaneously launch a public fundraising activity, "Donate together with Idol Li", through the Blog Public Welfare Platform of Sina Weibo, which raised over 1.1 million yuan of donations and materials. On the 51st Earth Day, Li and Ma Sichun were invited as the representative of "4.22 Earth Day: I Commit to Be a Responsible Consumer" series of public welfare activities, "Good for Earth, Good for Me: For the Earth for Ourselves" annual charity project (GEGM project). In their respective areas of concern, they spoke on the all-media platform in the form of public welfare posters and public welfare advocacy videos committed responsible consumers. In the public welfare advocacy videos, they all discussed about how to consume responsibly in their daily lives and earnestly consume responsibly from various aspects of clothing, food, housing, transportation and shopping. In February 2020, Li, along with Chang Shilei, Doudou, and Zhu Yilong, performed a song to support citizens of Wuhan in their fight against COVID-19. The lyrics express concern and gratitude towards the unsung medical heroes who sacrifice themselves for Wuhan.

Endorsements
Li Xian resonates with both male and female audiences. He has been a global spokesperson for a smartphone, luxury lifestyle brands, international sportswear, international cosmetics, an American clothing brand, a major Chinese manufacturer of appliances, the largest card payment organization, an online marketplace, home furniture, food, and beverages. He was appointed as the first brand ambassador of a resort and tourism campaign, which earned him Brand Value Star of the Year.

Filmography

Film
 Schemes in Antiques (2021) as Yao Buran
 Soul Snatcher (2020) as Bai Shisan
 Love Song 1980 (2020) as Liang Zhengwen
 Leap (2020, Special Appearance)
 The Captain (2019, cameo)
 The Enigma of Arrival (2020) as Xiao Long
 Nuts  (2018) as Xu Zicong
 The Founding of an Army (2017) as Luo Ruohang
 Deadly Love (2017) as Fang Zhibin
 Love O2O (2016) as Yu Banshan
 Who Sleeps My Bro (2016) as Xie Xun
 Singing When We're Young (2013) as Da Wei
 Feng Shui (2012) as Ma Xiaobao

Television
 Meet Yourself (2023) as Xie Zhiyao
 A Love Never Lost (2021) as Liang Xiang
 Go Go Squid 2: Dt.Appledog's Time (2021) as Han Shangyan 
 Sword Dynasty (2019-2020) as Ding Ning
 Go Go Squid! (2019) as Han Shangyan
 Women in Shanghai (2018) as Chen Xiaowei (Special appearance)
 Only Side by Side with You (2018) as Chang Jianxiong
 Tientsin Mystic (2017) as Guo Deyou
 Rush to the Dead Summer (2017) as Qing Yun (Cameo)
 Medical Examiner Dr. Qin (2016) as Lin Tao
 Who Sleeps My Bro (2016) as Xie Xun
 Four Ladies (2016) as Ding Zihui
 City of Fantasy (2014) as Ah Liang

Short film12 Years, we see it first (2013) Confess (2013)Interstellar Gift (2016)Somehow I love You (2020)11Left (TBA)

Variety ShowThe Theory of Relativity (2017)

Discography

Awards and nominations

Li's role as Guo Deyou in Tientsin Mystic earned him a nomination for Best Web Drama Actor at The Actors of China Awards and a popularity award from Netease Awards In 2019, his role as Han Shangyan on Go Go Squid! earned him a nomination for Best Newcomer at the Huading Awards , and a nomination at for Best Actor (Emerald Category) at The Actors of China Awards . He won Quality Actor of the Year at the Tencent Video All Star Awards and popularity awards from Weibo Weibo TV Awards, and iQIYI All-Star Carnival. He has also been recognized by GQ's Men of the Year, Esquire's Man at His Best Awards, and the Film and TV Role Model Annual Ranking. He won Best Choice of Multi-Screen Communication for an Influential Actor. The Beijing News selected him as an Entertainment Person of the Year, and he earned a spot in Forbes China's 30 Under 30 list.
He ranked 19th on Forbes'' China Celebrity 100 list.

References

External links 

 Li Xian's profile on Easy Entertainment 
 
Li Xian's Instagram

1991 births
Living people
Male actors from Hubei
People from Jingzhou
Beijing Film Academy alumni
Chinese male film actors
Chinese male television actors
21st-century Chinese male actors